Miguel Cardoso (born 15 January 1993) is a Portuguese basketball player for FC Porto of the Liga Portuguesa de Basquetebol and the Portuguese national team. During his career, he has played in Portugal, France and in the EuroLeague.

Club career
Cardoso started his career with FC Porto in 2010.

In October 2020, Cardoso signed with Úrvalsdeild karla club Valur. He appeared in 26 games for Valur during the season, averaging 16.2 points and 5.3 assists.

Before 2021–22 season he has joined Sporting Clube de Portugal of the Liga Portuguesa de Basquetebol.

References

External links
Profile at Eurobasket.com
Icelandic statistics at Icelandic Basketball Association
Euroleague Profile
Statistics at proballers.com

1993 births
Living people
FC Porto basketball players
Point guards
Portuguese men's basketball players
UJAP Quimper 29 players
Úrvalsdeild karla (basketball) players
Valur men's basketball players